A memorial commemorating victims of the September 11 attacks, known as the 9/11 Memorial or Garden of Remembrance, is installed in Boston Public Garden, in Boston, Massachusetts, United States.

See also
 Memorials and services for the September 11 attacks

References

External links
 
 Memorial Sites: Boston Public Garden 9/11 Memorial, Voices of September 11th

Boston Public Garden
Memorials for the September 11 attacks
Monuments and memorials in Boston